Two ships of the United States Navy have borne the name USS Bluefish, after the bluefish (Pomatomus saltatrix).

 , was a Gato-class submarine, commissioned in 1943 and struck in 1959.
 , was a Sturgeon-class submarine, commissioned in 1971 and struck in 1996.

References

United States Navy ship names